Silent Sam refers to a statue of a Confederate soldier on the campus of the University of North Carolina at Chapel Hill. 

Silent Sam may also refer to:

 Silent Sam (comics)
 The name of a Canadian distilled vodka produced by Diageo
 Silent Sam, The Dancing Midget, a stage name for Sammy Davis, Jr. when he was a child
 Silent Sam, the order entry terminal at Service Merchandise stores
 Sam Calder (1916–2008), Australian politician and World War II flying ace
 Samuel Pierce (1922–2000), American lawyer and politician